The Ministry of the Interior of the Republic of Cuba, also known as MININT, is the Cuban government ministry which oversees the home affairs of Cuba. Its headquarter is in a building of Plaza de la Revolución, a central and famous square of Havana.

History
It was founded on June 6, 1961, replacing and expanding the old Ministry of the Interior (Ministerio de Gobernación), inherited by the Cuban Revolution from the previous governments.

Functions
The organs and structures that are part of the Minister fulfill functions of citizen security, and the establishment of the internal order. The MININT also includes various logistics agencies, force preparation, etc. In addition, it has commercial companies that provide security services as SEPSA (Specialized Protection Services, S.A.), SEISA or ACERPROT), which include chain stores selling to the population.

The Ministry oversees the functions of security and public order through the National Revolutionary Police Force (PNR) and the auxiliary body of the Committees for the Defense of the Revolution (CDR).

The MININT has its own teaching system, with several national schools (higher institutes) and schools in the provinces. In Havana, it has a polytechnic institute (named Instituto Superior del MININT Eliseo Reyes Rodríguez), for the training of media technicians in specialties related to criminal and police investigation lines.

Structure
The following structure is in place with MININT as of 2021:

 National Revolutionary Police Force
 Dirección de Inteligencia
 State Security Department
 Technical Directorate of Investigations
 Directorate of Border Guard Troops
 Cuban Fire Department
 Directorate of Personal Security
 Directorate of Criminal Investigation and Operations 
 Directorate of Penitentiary Establishments 
 Directorate of Attention to Minors
 Directorate of Identification, Immigration and Aliens

Ministers
† denotes people who died in office.

References

External links

Interior
Cuba